The surname  Katzenellenbogen originated in the Rhineland, Germany. The surname is derived from the County of Katzenelnbogen and the Castle Katzenelnbogen. The origin of the name may come from Chatti Melibokus. Chatti Melibokus is an old tribe who reside in the southern part of the mountains in the Bergstraße region, which is part of Hesse in Germany.

Notable people with this surname include:

 Basil Kazen Ellenbogen (1917–1996), British Army officer and consultant physician (born Katzenellenbogen)
 Benita Katzenellenbogen (born 1945), American biologist
 Edwin Katzen-Ellenbogen (born 1882), Austrian-Polish and American eugenicist and physician in the Buchenwald concentration camp (also known as Katzenellenbogen)
 Eyran Katsenelenbogen (born 1965), jazz pianist
 Ezekiel Katzenellenbogen (born about 1670), Polish-German rabbi
 Gershon Ellenbogen (1917–2003), British barrister, author and Liberal Party politician (born Katzenellenbogen)
 John Katzenellenbogen (born 1944), American professor of chemistry
 Konrad Kellen (1913–2007), German-born American political scientist, intelligence analyst and author. (born Katzenellenbogen)
 Ludwig Katzenellenbogen (1877–1944), German brewery director
 Meir ben Isaac Katzenellenbogen (died 1565), Italian rabbi
 Ostap Ortwin (1876–1942), whose real name was Oskar Katzenellenbogen, Polish journalist and literary critic
 Samuel Judah Katzenellenbogen, Italian rabbi, son of Meir Katzenellenbogen
  (1914–2004), German-American banker and philanthropist (born Katzenellenbogen)

William III of England who was a Prince of Orange obtained the title Katzenelnbogen. The King of the Netherlands and the Duke of Luxembourg have the title "Count of Katzenelnbogen".

In popular culture
 "Gilly Gilly Ossenfeffer Katzenellen Bogen by the Sea", a 1954 popular song by Al Hoffman and Dick Manning
 a fictional family in the short story "The Spectre Bridegroom" in Washington Irving's 1819 collection The Sketch Book of Geoffrey Crayon, Gent.
 a fictional character in part 3 of Vasily Grossman's 1960 novel Life and Fate
 Yakov Katzenelenbogen, the fictional leader of the eponymous team in the Phoenix Force novels  

Derivative forms of the original name include Katsenelenbogen, Catzenellenbogen, Elbogen, and Katz.
Eyran Katsenelenbogen (born 1965), Israeli-born American jazz pianist
Tamara Katsenelenbogen (1894–1976), Russian architect

See also
Katz (surname)

References

Jewish surnames
Yiddish-language surnames
German-language surnames

de:Katzenellenbogen